Delonix baccal is a species of leguminous tree in the family Fabaceae. It is found in Ethiopia, Kenya, and Somalia.

References

baccal
Trees of Ethiopia
Flora of Kenya
Flora of Somalia
Near threatened flora of Africa
Taxonomy articles created by Polbot